Camphausen is a German surname. Notable people with the name include:
 Gottfried Ludolf Camphausen (1803–1890), Prussian politician and Prime Minister
 Otto von Camphausen (1812–1896), Prussian statesman
 Wilhelm Camphausen (1818–1885, Düsseldorf), painter of historical and battle scenes

German-language surnames